is the seventh work of the Musha Gundam series. Running period, 1995 to 1996.

Outline
Characters this time round are derived from the mobile weapons of Mobile Fighter G Gundam. The main protagonist and antagonist both hold relationships to characters of Densetsu no Daishougun Hen. And this time there is a bigger scale crossover with characters from the SD Command Senki, Knight Gundam and Gundlander worlds.

It is the only family strife story of the series as both the main protagonist and antagonist are related by blood which also made it a favourite among fans.

Story
Several years have passed since the incident of the falling of the Islands of the Sky. V-maru returns home, to Birmingham Town (破悪民我夢の街), from his musha training. He had changed his name to Godmaru. Things don't look good back home and something had changed about his brother Victory who is currently the Daishougun. While investigating the matter, Godmaru became a wanted enemy of Ark. He was told to go to Gaunland (俄雲乱土) by Bakuryuu to attain a new power. He travelled with four fighters from foreign lands who he gained their friendship through battle. During the journey Godmaru realized that Master is the mastermind and that he had turned Victory to stone and seized the rulership for himself. Master plans to open the Gate to the Netherworld that is sealed beneath Retteijou (烈帝城). Having gained the divine instruments from the awakened Tengaiou, the group returned to Retteijou, where the opening of the Netherworld gate has begun. Tengaiou tried his best to seal the evil energy but Master seized the opportunity and fused with Tengaiou, gaining a massive power up becoming Batou Daishougun. Chou Kidou Daishougun was summoned by Bird Gundam and the fate of Ark is left to Godmaru. A climatic clash ensues where the form of both mushas disappeared.

Characters

Touha Gonin Shuu (闘覇五人衆)
Musha Godmaru/ Chou Kidou Daishougun (武者號斗丸/超機動大将軍)
Design basis: God Gundam
Younger brother of Victory Daishougun, V-maru. He has grown stronger from the training with Bakuryuu Gundam and has changed his name to Godmaru. He can't believe that his brother exerted tyranny on the people and seeks to find an answer. And due to that he became an enemy of Ark and is being hunted with a bounty for his head. He combined with the Kidou Tenkuu Jou, a divine armour with the power of the Tentei, and became the Chou Kidou Daishougun. His whereabouts were unknown after the battle with Master.
Later on appeared in Kidou Musha Taisen, Bushin Kirahagane and Mushamaruden.

Kiryuu Gundam (輝龍頑駄無)
Design basis: Dragon Gundam
Nephew of Souryuu Gundam, one of the Ryuuga Clan of Abram. He does have good skills but he is overconfident and lack discipline. After being lectured by Hakuryuu Taitei he decided to prove his abilities at Ark where Hakuryuu Taitei commented that there are powerful mushas. During his journey he met Godmaru and challenged him to a duel, in the duel he understood what it is to be truly strong and he matured a little. He address Godmaru as "aniki" and they travelled together to Guanland.

Musha Max (武者真紅主)
Design basis: Gundam Maxter
A musha from a foreign land (the Mazelan Continent of the SD Command Senki world). He came to Ark to meet the legendary hero - the Daishougun who saved Ark, and to do that he half-heartedly become the pupil of Tetra Gundam. After obtaining information about the Daishougun's assassination incident, he tracked down and fought Godmaru. But a rude untimely interruption by the Gundam Army, a young girl was chased and Max tried to save her but was endangered and was in turn saved by Godmaru. This event enraged both Max and Godmaru and they both jointly defeated the intruders. Talks with a mix of English and Japanese. Hot-blooded and has a strong sense of justice.

Musha Rose (武者鷺主)
Design basis: Gundam Rose
A musha from a foreign land (Saddarc World of Knight Gundam). He encountered a mishap during his voyage and was helped by the Gundam Army and to repay the kind deed he works as a musha for the Gundam Army. But he started questioning himself when the Daishougun became a tyrant, then he decided to betray the Gundam Army and join Godmaru. Carries within him the pride and honor of the Knight lineage.

Musha Bolt (武者冒流刀)
Design basis: Bolt Gundam
A musha from a foreign land (Gundlander continent). Left his (destroyed?)country to see the world and has since arrived at Ark. But he was suffering from serious injuries when he set foot on Ark, Victory Daishougun kindly offered help. After recovering he participated the tournament at Retteijou and emerged victorious, earning him the title of Musha and a place in the Gundam Army. A member of the suppression party that is after Godmaru, he was displeased with the unfair ways of the Gundam Army. User of the Boltlander style, a quiet character with enormous strength.

Others 
Victory Daishougun (飛駆鳥大将軍)
Protagonist of the previous work. Succeeded Shinsei Daishougun as the new ruler of Ark, but suddenly shady characters were enlisted as subordinates and tyranny is forced onto the people. The real Victory has been turned to stone by Master and Master is now ruling in the guise of Victory. Unknown to Master, the real Victory was in fact rescued by Blade and what was stoned is just the armour, Victory borrowed Blade's appearance and secretly helped the Touha Gonnin Shuu. One of the New Sanresshin.

Tekki Musha Haganemaru (鉄機武者鋼丸)
Design basis: ZII
An artificial musha made by Bakuryuu Gundam with reference from Daihagane. He has feelings although he is an artificial musha. He is a close friend of Godmaru and they both trained together under Bakuryuu. When his anger reach its peak he transforms to the gigantic Konkou Haganemaru form(金剛鋼丸形態). In this form Haganemaru loses his mind and becomes the embodiment of destruction, attacking both allies and enemies.
He too finds the Daishougun's actions questionable and decide to help Godmaru, opposing the Gundam Army. At Gaunland with the mysterious power of Light given out by Tengaiou, Haganemaru transform to Konkou Haganemaru form without losing his mind.
In the Comic World version, he died covering Godmaru from a blast, he told Godmaru to save Tengaiou and entrusted the future of Ark to Godmaru. In the Bom Bom version, he died by a blast from Master while saving Victory.
In the assembly manual of Tekki Musha Bakushinmaru, the brother machine of Haganemaru that appears in the next work, it was said that the Haganemaru is currently under repairs by Bakuryuu Gundam.

Blade Gundam (武零斗頑駄無)
Design basis: Gundam Spiegel
Head of Ark's Ninja Corps, the Blade Ningun(武零斗忍軍). The son of Onmitsu Fukushougun, Suigetsu(彗月). Rescued Victory Daishougun during Master's attack and helps the Touha Gonin Shuu in secret. One of the New Sanresshin.

Bird Gundam (羽荒斗頑駄無)
Design basis: Wing Gundam
Son of Kensei Fukushougun. Trained under a Tenkuu Bujin(天空武人) and is now one. He possesses great power that can rival that of Batou Daishougun but the rule of the Heavens forbids Tenkuu Bujin to directly interfere with earthly happenings. So he summoned the Kidou Tenkuu Jou, leaving the fight to Godmaru. One of the New Sanresshin. In the Comic World version he has an eminent attitude which is quite different from him in the Bom Bom version.

Legacy of the Tenkuu Bujin (天空武人の遺産)
Kidou Bujin Tengaiou (機動武神 天鎧王)
Design basis: Ξ GUNDAM, Devil Gundam
A mysterious stone statue at Gaunland. The true form of the statue is the legendary Kidou Bujin left on Earth since ancient times by the Tenkuu Bujin. On being unsealed it granted the Touha Gonin Shuu with the legendary divine instruments and gave Haganemaru a new power. He fights with the Touha Gonin Shuu to stop Master's plans to connect the Netherworld to Ark. While sealing the Gate of the Netherworld in the battle at Retteijou, Master fused with Tengaiou to become Batou Daishougun.

Kidou Tenkuu Jou (機動天空城)
A legacy of the Tenkuu Bujin and has existed since ancient times. A fortress containing the power of Tentei, a gigantic suit of armour. Has the ability to transform to the powerful Chou Kidou Daishougun. Was summoned by Bird Gundam in the battle with Master. Godmaru who displayed his the powers of the "Ten" divine instrument(天の神具) was allowed by Bird to use the Tenkuu Jou.

Nooberu (農鈴)
 Design basis: Noble Gundam
Daughter of Albion ruler, Gundam Ashura. Witnessed Master turning Victory to stone and is being chased by the Gundam Army. Barged into Max's and Godmaru's fight and was saved by them.

Suishin (彗心)
 Design basis: Minaret Gundam
Second-in-command of the Blade Ningun. Holds a crescent blade called Minaretou which he uses with great skill.

Suiren (彗連)
 Design basis: Rising Gundam
One of the minority Kunoichi in Blade Ningun. An excellent ninga and one of the best archers in the ninja corps.

Master Army (魔星軍団) 
Master Daishougun/ Batou Daishougun (魔星大将軍/覇道大将軍)
 Design basis: Master Gundam, Master Gundam + Devil Gundam
A fukushougun of Ark and younger brother of Gouten Gundam. He always thought that his older brother should be the one to become Daishougun and he would be the one who would then succeed him instead of one from Shinsei Daishougun's bloodline. For this he bears a grudge against the Shinsei Daishougun bloodline and used the power of the Netherworld to conquer Ark.
He turned Victory to stone, gaining power over the Gundam Army. After that he exerted tyranny over Ark as Victory, he then sent assassins after Godmaru who is investigating the matter. Combining with the three Rashou he gained the Yamijyuusou form. In the final battle he fused with Tengaiou to become Batou Daishougun.
After the battle with Godmaru his whereabouts are unknown. In Chou Kidou Musha Taisen, he appeared in his original form, cleared off the curse of darkness. He made an appearance in Musha Senki Hikari no Hengen Hen. Godmaru and Victory are his nephews.

Rashou Heavens (羅将天国途)
Design basis: Gundam Heaven's Sword
Rashou of the Sky. One of the three Yami Rashou summoned from the Nether world. Has a vengeful character and he never let his prey escape.

Rashou Grand (羅将愚嵐怒)
Design basis: Grand Gundam
The Beast Rashou. One of the three Yami Rashou summoned from the Nether world. Lets his rage out on enemies and allies alike, a dangerous guy.

Rashou Walter (羅将宇折堕)
Design basis: Walter Gundam
Rashou of the Sea. One of the three Yami Rashou summoned from the Nether world. The schemer among the three. In the Bom Bom version, he controlled the seven Choushougun and turned them against the Touha Gonin Shuu.

Gattai Rashou Fuunsaiki (合身羅将風雲再起)
Design basis: Fuunsaiki
The combined form of the three Rashou. A battlesteed that has the speed of Heavens, strength of Ground and wisdom of Walter. Moves freely on air, land and sea. Master rides on it.

Musha Neros (武者熱呂宗)
Design basis: Neros Gundam
Leader of the Musha Neros team. One who will resort to unfair means in order to win.

Musha Johnbull (武者序武留)
Design basis: John Bull Gundam
Leader of the Musha Johnbull team. One who uses rational means to get the job done. He knows the Master is the mastermind but nevertheless serves him.

Busshi (武志)
Design basis: Busshi
Foot soldiers of the Musha Neros team.

Nobusshi (野武志)
Design basis: Nobusshi
Foot soldiers of the Musha Johnbull team.

Genin Army, Birdy, Navi (下忍悪魅、羽兵、鮎尾)
Design basis: Death Army
The infantry of the Master Army each specializing in air, land and sea.

Glossary
Touha Gonin Shuu (闘覇五人衆)
The five mushas that received the divine instruments from Tengaiou. The four except Godmaru went on to become the new Four Devas of Fuurinkazan.

Retteijou (烈帝城)
The residence of the Daishougun of Ark, located at Birmingham Town. It is built right on top of the Gate of the Netherworld.

Game
Shin SD Sengokuden Kidou Musha Taisen (PlayStation)
A realtime simulation RPG that connects the stories of Chou Kidou Daishougun Hen and Bushin Kirahagane Hen. Stars characters from Shichinin no Choushougun Hen, Chou Kidou Daishougun Hen, Bushin Kirahagane Hen and original characters. The game is released in 1996.
Has original main characters, Tsukikage Gundam, Hien Gundam and Ryuuko Gundam to choose from.

SD Gundam